

Winners

1980s

1990s

2000s

2010s

2020s

References

External links

Boston Society of Film Critics Awards
Awards for best cinematography